Ian John Painter (born 28 December 1964) is an English former professional footballer who played for Stoke City and Coventry City. He made 116 appearances in the Football League.

Career
Painter was born in Wombourne, Staffordshire, England, but graduated from Stoke's youth system at the Victoria Ground, making his debut one day before his 18th birthday against Everton in 1982. He became a key player for The Potters at a time when the club was struggling both on and off the field, earning an England under-21 call up in 1983, and also became the club's top scorer in the 1984–85 season. However Stoke were relegated with just 17 points and new manager Mick Mills decided Painter was surplus to requirements and let him join Coventry City for a fee of £85,000. His time at Coventry was overshadowed by injuries and made only three appearances before he decided to retire from football at the age of 23. He later played for non-league Willenhall Town to keep fit.

Managerial career
He became manager of non-league side Bilston Town in 1995 before managing Stafford Rangers from 1998 to 2002. He was also manager of Hednesford Town from August 2002 to February 2003.
Also managed Ounsdale Mount in Wolverhampton Sunday League.

After football
He spent four years in non-league before he became a part-time coach whilst also owning a sports shop in Wombourne. He joined the Coventry City Former Players Association in October 2011.

Career statistics
Source:

References

External links
 

English footballers
Stoke City F.C. players
Coventry City F.C. players
English Football League players
England under-21 international footballers
1964 births
Living people
Willenhall Town F.C. players
Stafford Rangers F.C. managers
Hednesford Town F.C. managers
Bilston Town F.C. managers
Association football forwards
English football managers